Danny McAllister (1919–2008) was an Irish sportsperson.  He played hurling with his local club Glenariff and with the Antrim senior inter-county team in the 1940s and 1950s. He played full forward in the 1943 All Ireland hurling final against Cork - the first of only two occasions that Antrim reached the All Ireland final.

References
 Corry, Eoghan, The GAA Book of Lists (Hodder Headline Ireland, 2005).
 Donegan, Des, The Complete Handbook of Gaelic Games (DBA Publications Limited, 2005).
 Fullam, Brendan, Captains of the Ash (Wolfhound Press, 2002).

External links
 Antrim GAA honours

1919 births
2008 deaths
Glenariff hurlers
Antrim inter-county hurlers